U-50488 is a drug which acts as a highly selective κ-opioid agonist, but without any μ-opioid antagonist effects. It has analgesic, diuretic and antitussive effects, and reverses the memory impairment produced by anticholinergic drugs. U-50488 was one of the first selective kappa agonists invented and research on its derivatives has led to the development of a large family of related compounds. This compound has never received FDA approval and there are no reported human cases in the literature involving an U-50488 overdose.

See also 
 U-47700
 U-69,593

References 

Chlorobenzenes
Acetamides
Pyrrolidines
Kappa-opioid receptor agonists